Gretchen Schubert is a 1926 German silent film directed by Karl Moos.

The film's sets were designed by the art directors Robert Neppach and Bernhard Schwidewski

Cast
In alphabetical order
 Ruth Beyer 
 Ines Decastro 
 Wilhelm Diegelmann 
 Hermann Picha 
 Erich Poremski 
 Lydia von Rodenberg 
 Max Willenz

References

Bibliography
 Claus Tieber & Anna Katharina Windisch. The Sounds of Silent Films: New Perspectives on History, Theory and Practice. Palgrave Macmillan, 2014.

External links

1926 films
Films of the Weimar Republic
German silent feature films
German black-and-white films